Bongo Gewog (Dzongkha: སྦོང་སྒོར་) is a gewog (village block) of Chukha District, Bhutan. The gewog is the largest in the district with an area of 396 square kilometres. It contains 15 villages.

References

Gewogs of Bhutan
Chukha District